Humanitarian aid workers belonging to United Nations organisations, PVOs / NGOs or the Red Cross / Red Crescent have traditionally enjoyed both international legal protection, and de facto immunity from attack by belligerent parties. However, ' attacks on humanitarian workers have occasionally occurred, and become more frequent since the 1990s and 2000s. In 2017, the Aid Worker Security Database (AWSD) documented 139 humanitarian workers killed in intentional attacks out of the estimated global population of 569,700 workers. In every year since 2013, more than 100 humanitarian workers were killed. This is attributed to a number of factors, including the increasing number of humanitarian workers deployed, the increasingly unstable environments in which they work, and the erosion of the perception of neutrality and independence. In 2012 road travel was seen to be the most dangerous context, with kidnappings of aid workers quadrupling in the last decade, reaching more aid workers victims than any other form of attack.

The foremost collector of data on attacks against humanitarian workers is the Aid Worker Security Database, which has strict parameters allowing for the data to be compared across the globe over time, producing useful analysis for the humanitarian, policy and academic community. Armed Conflict Location & Event Data Project (ACLED) is another database that includes attacks on humanitarian workers in addition to other conflict-related incidents. Insecurity Insight produces monthly Aid in Danger reports that highlight attacks during the month from news media, the AWSD and ACLED.

Legal basis for the protection of humanitarian workers

The legal basis for the protection of humanitarian workers in armed conflicts is contained in the Geneva Conventions of 1949 and the related Protocols I and II of 1977. These treaties describe the category of civilians and outline the rights and obligations of non-combatants during armed conflicts. These rights include the right to be treated humanely; to have access to food, water, shelter, medical treatment, and communications; to be free from violence to life and person, hostage taking, and humiliating or degrading treatment; and the prohibition against collective punishment or imprisonment. Non-combatants include citizens and nationals of countries that are not a party to the conflict.

While the Geneva Conventions guarantee protection for humanitarian workers, they do not guarantee access of humanitarian workers to affected areas: governments or occupying forces may, if they wish, ban a relief agency from working in their area. Médecins Sans Frontières was created in 1971 with the express purpose of ignoring this restriction, by providing assistance to populations affected by the Biafran civil war despite the prohibitions of the government of Nigeria.

In addition, the Geneva Conventions do not require that parties to the conflict guarantee the safety of humanitarian workers. The Conventions prohibit combatants from attacking non-combatants, and they require occupying forces to maintain general order. However, the Conventions do not require that combating parties provide security escorts, for example, when other factions threaten the safety of non-combatants operating in their area.

In 2003, the United Nations Security Council passed Resolution 1502 giving greater protection to humanitarian workers and treating attacks on them as a war crime.  ICRC promotes a framework for Neutral Independent Humanitarian Action (NIHA) to enable differentiated role understanding.

Motives 
The method of targeting foreigners through suicide bombings, IEDs and kidnappings (often closely associated with criminal and political actors) is strong evidence of at least some political motivations against aid workers. It is very hard often to precisely ascertain a motive; for instance, in 55% of the incidents recorded by the AWSD in 2008, the motive was described as ‘undetermined’. However, of those that were determined, political motivations have increased (29% of the determined total in 2003 to 49% in 2008) relative to economic motivations, or when the victim's status as an aid worker was only incidental. Afghanistan, as one of the most dangerous countries for humanitarian workers to operate in is influential in this changing dynamic; in 2007 61% of incidents were carried out by criminals and 39% by political opposition groups, but in 2008, 65% of incidents were the work of armed opposition groups.

Aid workers can be targeted for political reasons both directly and by association. Sometimes the humanitarian organisation may be targeted for something that it has done or a statement it has made, or simply for the delivery of aid to a population, to whom others do not wish aid to reach. It can also be targeted as a result of being associated as an entity collaborating with the 'enemy' (a government, rebel group or foreign power). The dangers of being associated with specific governments or armed forces have further increased the determination of aid workers to be seen as separate, independent and neutral politically. However, evidence shows that this has little impact and instead that western aid agencies are perceived as an intrinsic part of the western 'agenda' and not merely associated with it. In the case of Afghanistan, with the notable exception of the International Committee of the Red Cross, it has been surmised that locals no longer make distinctions (as they once did) between organisations, e.g. those were working with the coalition force's Provincial Reconstruction Teams and those that did not. In remote areas, they sometimes represent the only accessible western target. Although empirical studies on aid worker insecurity have been scarce, two have been conducted in Afghanistan. Watts (2004) did not find evidence indicating heightened aid worker insecurity in provinces where the US military was present. Similarly, Mitchell (2015) was unable to discover a relationship between attacks against NGOs and their proximity to the US military or US-led PRTs respectively; however, his study did reveal that aid workers were more likely to encounter a greater number of security incidents in provinces with PRTs not led by the US.

Trends in risks faced by humanitarian workers

 Wars between states became much less common in the period following the end of the Cold War. Unfortunately, these wars have been largely replaced by an increased incidence of internal conflict and resulting violence and miscommunication, increasing the risk to civilians and humanitarian workers alike.
 Most deaths of aid workers are due to deliberate violence.
 One-third of deaths occur in the first three months of deployment, with 17% occurring within the first 30 days.
 Since 2006, violence is once again on the increase and growth in the number of incidents is faster than the growth in the number of humanitarian aid workers.

Attacks on health care 
Among all attacks, those on health care are numerous. Hospitals, clinics and ambulances are attacked and health workers are injured or killed. As to the Safeguarding Health in Conflict Coalition initiative there have been 973 attacks on health in 23 countries in 2018. Attacks usually either target wounded and sick individuals, health personnel, facilities or medical transport; facilities or medical emblems are misused. These attacks have a negative impact on the overall delivery of health care. Despite the immediate effects of deaths, injuries and the destruction of facilities, the long-term effects are often even more severe. Already weakened health systems, due to present conflicts, get targeted. That can lead to the collapse of entire health systems that are urgently needed in conflicts. The health systems are unable to cope with the situation, people have no access to health care and long-term public health goals are almost impossible to achieve. Many facilities have to close after attacks, hospitals run out of supplies and health projects, like vaccination campaigns, come to halt. Additionally, staff leave their posts, flee the region or country and international organizations withdraw their staff and/ or close projects. The general access to health facilities and care is restricted for people in need. The number of people affected indirectly is therefore even higher than the actual number of victims. Moreover, attacks have a negative impact on the psychological well-being of staff and affect their motivation as well as the quality of care provided by them.

List of major attacks on humanitarian workers

A full downloadable list of major incidents, from 1997–present, of violence against aid workers, can be found at Humanitarian Outcomes' Aid Worker Security Database.

1964 

 Democratic Republic of the Congo – Jean Plicque (ILO) and Francois Preziosi (UNHCR) were killed by Congolese rebels.

1993
 Somalia – January 2, 1993 - A gunman killed Sean Devreaux, 28, a British worker for UNICEF in Kismayu.
 Somalia – February 22, 1993 - Gunmen killed Valerie Place, 23, an Irish nurse with the charity Concern.
 Bosnia – July 5, 1993 – Scottish aid worker Christine Witcutt shot and killed by a sniper in Sarajevo.
 Bosnia – October 25, 1993 – Danish aid worker Bjarne Vium Nielsen was killed in an attack on a humanitarian aid convoy.

1996
 Burundi – June 4, 1996 – Three ICRC delegates were killed in an attack on two vehicles on the road between the villages of Rugombo and Mugina in the northern province of Cibitoke, resulting in a withdrawal of ICRC from Burundi.
 Novye Atagi, Chechnya – December 17, 1996 – Six ICRC workers are killed in an attack on the local hospital. As a result, ICRC withdraws all expatriate staff from Chechnya.
 Guatemala, 1996 – One Costa Rican Salvation Army officer is attacked by demobilized guerrilla members while transporting a senior citizen with a broken leg to the hospital. The vehicle was taken.

1997
 Somaliland region of Somalia – November 23, 1997 – UN negotiates with clan elders for the release of five kidnapped aid workers.
 Mogadishu, Somalia – November 26, 1997 – All foreign aid workers withdraw from the city following the abduction of two Italian aid workers.
 Guatemala – 1997 – When returning from a mission, one Costa Rican Salvation Army officer was hijacked by gunmen and held hostage for a short time. The vehicle was taken.

1998
 Somalia – April 21, 1998 – 10 aid workers held hostage.
 Bujumbura, Burundi – June 10, 1998 – One Danish aid worker was killed by car thieves in the capital.
 Central Sudan – June 10, 1998 – Three Sudanese UN staff were killed and three wounded when gunmen fire on a UN vehicle.
 Arua, (North West) Rwanda – July 10, 1998 – Ugandan driver for UN World Food Programme (WFP) killed by rebels.
 Bujumbura, Burundi – July 24, 1998 – One Italian World Food Programme (WFP) staff member was killed in the capital.
 Congo-Brazzaville – November 1998 – Major Eugene Nsingani The Salvation Army on a peace mission with eight people, was gunned down and killed along with five more.

1999
 South Sudan – January 4, 1999 – Four ICRC staff killed by SPLA (abducted in February, murdered in April).
 Southern, Somalia – January 27, 1999 – One Kenyan aid worker was killed by gunmen.
 Lesotho – February 4, 1999 – Irish aid worker (Ken Hickley) robbed and murdered.
 Bundibugyo, Uganda – April 23, 1999 – Many aid workers flee the area to avoid attacks by Allied Democratic Forces.
 Belgrade, Serbia – May 26, 1999 – Three aid workers put on trial for spying.
 Angola – June 15, 1999 – Two aid workers were killed when gunmen ambush and rob them.
 Tajikistan – October 2 – French aid worker killed.
 Northern Kosovo – November 12, 1999 – 24 people on board a WFP aid flight died when Si Fly Flight 3275 crashed.

2000
 Balad, Somalia – January 3, 2000 – One local CARE staff shot dead in an ambush.
 North of Mogadishu, Somalia – January 4, 2000 – One CARE worker was shot dead in an ambush.
 Sudan – January 9, 2000 – 2 CARE staff killed and 2 missing after an ambush.
 Somalia – January 31, 2000 – Attacks on a convoy of aid vehicles leave 20 people dead.
 Ethiopia – February 9, 2000 – A medical organisation suspends operations in part of Ethiopia after the killing of a staff member.
 Ambon, Indonesia – May 22, 2000 – Foreign aid workers pulled out of Ambon to escape growing inter-communal violence.
 Sierra Leone – June 19, 2000 – One British aid worker (Alan Smith) was freed after being held for one month by rebels.
 Baghdad, Iraq – June 28, 2000 – Two FAO workers shot and killed.
 South Sudan – August 6, 2000 – Eight aid workers were killed when a vehicle was attacked near the border with Uganda.
 Atambua, Belu District, West Timor, Indonesia – September 6, 2000 – Five UNHCR staff members, Mr Samson Aregahegn (Supply Officer); Mr Carlos Caceres-Collazo (Protection Officer); and Mr Pero Simundza (Telecommunications Operator) and two Indonesians were killed when their office was attacked by militia.
 Macenta, Guinea – September 17, 2000 – The death of one UNHCR staff member and the abduction of another.
 Southern border Guinea – December 7, 2000 – Hundreds of people are left dead as rebels destroy the UNHCR centre.
 Afghanistan – December 9, 2000 – Seven people working for the UN mine clearance programme were killed in an ambush.
 Aceh, Indonesia – December 10, 2000 – Three aid workers killed.
 Burundi – December 30, 2000 – A British voluntary worker is one of 20 people killed by gunmen.
 Kigali, Rwanda – Samuel W. Sargbah - March 2, 2000- A Liberian Voluntary Humanitarian killed in his car

2001
 Eastern Democratic Republic of Congo – February 27, 2001 – Six ICRC staff killed.
 Mogadishu, Somalia – March 27, 2001 – MSF compound attacked by gunmen.
 Alkhan-Kala, Chechnya – April 18, 2001 – Viktor Popkov fatally wounded and two others injured in a shooting attack.
 Tajikistan, – June 16, 2001 – Kidnappers ask for the release of detained militants after taking a group of aid workers hostage.
 Banda Aceh, Indonesia – October 4, 2001 – Three more people, including a Red Cross worker who had been tortured, were killed.
 Afghanistan – November 15, 2001 – Eight western aid workers released after three months of captivity by Taliban.

2002
 Mogadishu, Somalia – February 23, 2002 – A Swiss woman who ran a small aid agency was shot dead.
 Mogadishu, Somalia – February 28, 2002 – One Somali UN worker was kidnapped hours after the region was declared too dangerous for permanent UN presence.
 Dagestan - August 12, 2002 - A Dutch MSF worker is abducted in Makhachkala.  He is released 20 months later.

2003
 Gaza Strip – March 16, 2003 – Rachel Corrie an American member of ISM was killed by an Israel Defense Forces (IDF) bulldozer when attempting to prevent the demolition of a Palestinian's home.
 Gaza Strip - April 11, 2003 - Tom Hurndall was a British photography student and member of ISM who was killed by an Israel Defense Forces (IDF) sniper. Hurndall was left in a coma and died nine months later. His killer Taysir Hayb was sentenced to eight years imprisonment for manslaughter and obstruction of justice but was released after serving six and a half years of his sentence.
 Baghdad, Iraq – August 19, 2003 – The bombing of the UN Headquarters at the Canal Hotel killed at least 24 people including Sérgio Vieira de Mello and wounded over 100.
 Baghdad, Iraq – October 27, 2003 – An attack on the ICRC building kills at least 12 people.
 Ghazni, eastern Afghanistan – November 16, 2003 – UNHCR staff person Bettina Goislard was shot dead by a motorcycle-borne gunman while travelling by car.
 Kandahar, southern Afghanistan – March 24, 2003 – ICRC staff member Ricardo Munguia was shot and killed in an ambush north of Kandahar City. He was working as a water engineer in Afghanistan and travelling with local colleagues on March 27, 2003, when their car was stopped by unknown armed men. He was killed execution-style at point-blank range while his colleagues were allowed to escape. He was 39 years old. The killing prompted the ICRC to temporarily suspend operations across Afghanistan.

2004
 Kabul, Afghanistan – February 26, 2004 – Five Afghans working for the Sanayee Development Foundation were killed when their vehicle was ambushed northeast of Kabul.
 Mosul, Iraq – March 15, 2004 –  Larry Elliott, Jean Dover Elliott, Karen Denise Watson, and David McDonnall were killed in a drive-by shooting. They were US missionaries for Southern Baptist International Mission Board.
 Kabul, Afghanistan – April 28, 2004 – Two Afghan aid workers and a soldier were killed in an attack in the Panjwayi district of southern Kandahar city.
 Badghis province, Afghanistan – June 2, 2004 – Five staff working for Médecins Sans Frontières were killed on the road between Khairkhana and Qala I Naw, resulting in the complete withdrawal of MSF from Afghanistan. The names of the murdered staff were: Hélène de Beir, Willem Kwint, Egil Tynaes, Fasil Ahmad and Besmillah.
 Darfur, Sudan – October 10, 2004 –  A Save the Children vehicle was hit by an anti-tank landmine in the Um Barro area of North Darfur, Sudan. Two members of staff travelling in the vehicle were killed, Rafe Bullick (British, Programme Manager, North Darfur) and Nourredine Issa Tayeb (Sudanese, Water Engineer).

2005
 Baghdad, Iraq – April 16, 2005 – Marla Ruzicka and her Iraqi translator, Faiz Ali Salim, was killed by a suicide car bombing on Airport Road in Baghdad.
 South Sudan/Uganda, – November 5, 2005 – Collin Lee who worked for International Aid Services died when his jeep, containing his wife and driver, was ambushed by the LRA in South Sudan.

2006
Vavuniya, Sri Lanka – May 15 – An employee of the Norwegian Refugee Council is shot dead on his way back from work.
Muttur, Sri Lanka – August 4 or August 5–17 workers from the aid group Action Against Hunger were found murdered on August 6 in northeastern Sri Lanka. They were working on post-2004 tsunami reconstruction. There had been fierce fighting in the area for more than a week. (See Muttur massacre.)

2007
2007 Mogadishu TransAVIAexport Airlines Il-76 crash
Darfur – between 1 January 2006 and 31 August 2007 –  A total of 12 humanitarian workers were killed, including four working for the Government's water project.
Colombo, Sri Lanka – June 3, 2007 – Two Red cross workers were abducted and murdered in Sri Lanka.
El Bared refugee camp, Lebanon – June 11, 2007 – Two Lebanese Red Cross workers were killed and a third wounded.
South Sudan – A driver of the World Food Program was killed in an ambush.
Central African Republic – June 11, 2007 – An MSF logistician was killed when her car was hit by gunfire during an assessment mission near Paoua .
Algeria  – On 11 December 2007, 10 United Nations staff died in a double car bombing in the Algerian capital, Algiers, which killed at least 26 people and injured 177.
Somalia – December 26, 2007 – A nurse and a doctor working for MSF in Bossaso were abducted. After one week, they were released .
Burundi  – On Monday, December 31, 2007, at 6:30 pm, an Action Against Hunger vehicle was targeted by shooters in the city of Ruyigi in the East of Burundi. Five people, including three female expatriate staff of Action Against Hunger, were inside the targeted vehicle. One of them, a French psychologist of Action Against Hunger, died upon arrival at the hospital in Gitega as a result of her injuries. The second victim suffered a gunshot wound and underwent surgery in Gitega. The third Action Against Hunger expatriate escaped uninjured from the shooting.

2008
 Kabul, Afghanistan – January 14 – Six people, including at least one aid worker from the USA named Thor Hesla, were killed in an attack on the Serena Hotel.
 Kandahar, Afghanistan – January 26 – An aid worker and her Afghan driver were kidnapped in Kandahar and are presumed dead.
 Kismayo, Somalia – January 28 – A surgeon, a logistician and a driver working for Médecins Sans Frontières (MSF) were killed when their convoy was attacked between the hospital and their base .
 Chad - May 1, 2008 - The country director of Save the Children UK is shot dead when his car was attacked near Hadjer Hadid in eastern Chad .
 Colombo, Sri Lanka – May 16 – A Batticaloa-based employee of the Norwegian Refugee Council is abducted while visiting the capital and disappears, presumed dead.
 Arusha, Tanzania – June 30 – An Australian working with the Australian not-for-profit organisation foodwatershelter was killed during a robbery.
 Logar Province, Afghanistan – August 13 – Three female International Rescue Committee (IRC) workers and their local driver were killed in an ambush as they drove back to Kabul. One was an American named Nicole Dial.http://newsday.co.tt/news/0,84420.html
 Somali Region, Ethiopia - September 22, 2008 - A nurse and a doctor working for Medecins du Monde are kidnapped in Fadhigaradle village and taken across the border to Somalia. They are released 4 months later .
 Merka, Somalia – October 17 – A senior programme assistant for the World Food Programme (WFP) was shot and killed as he left a mosque.
 Kabul, Afghanistan – October 20 – An aid worker with SERVE Afghanistan was killed as she walked to work.
 Gurilel, Somalia – October 25 – A local worker with the aid agency Iida was killed as she returned from work.

2009
 Several aid workers were kidnapped while in northern Yemen.
 Two Chechen aid workers were kidnapped and murdered in Chechnya.
 Bakool, Somalia - April 19, 2009 - Two MSF doctors are kidnapped and released 9 days later .
 An Irish charity worker was killed during a mugging in Zanzibar.
 Chad - August 4, 2009 - A logistician working for MSF and his Chadian assistant were kidnapped in Ade. The Chadian was freed soon afterwards while the logistician was released only a month later .
 Pakistan – 5 October 2009 3 United Nations staff killed in a suicide bombing attack against the office of the World Food Programme in the capital city Islamabad.
 West Darfur, Sudan - October 22, 2009 - A French ICRC delegate is kidnapped and released after 5 months .
 Afghanistan - 28 October 2009 5 United Nations staff, two Afghan security personnel, and an Afghan civilian were killed by three Taliban attackers in an assault on the Bekhtar Guesthouse in Kabul.  Nine other UN staff, also there working for the presidential election, were wounded.  The attackers used AK-47s, grenades, and suicide vests.
 Birao, Central African Republic - November 22, 2009 - Two French aid workers employed by Triangle Generation Humanitaire are kidnapped and held for 4 months before being freed in Darfur .

2010

 Gaza Strip: On 31 May 2010, the Israeli navy killed 9 members of the "Gaza Freedom Flotilla" attempting to bring aid to the Gaza strip, and breach the Israeli naval blockade. The Gaza flotilla raid caused worldwide controversy.
 Abéche, Chad - June 6, 2010 - A logistician working for Oxfam GB was kidnapped in Abéche.  He was rescued 10 days later by Chadian security forces near the border with Sudan .
 Afghanistan: On 7 August 2010, 10 men and women who were working for a Christian aid agency were murdered by the Taliban. Two Afghan interpreters, six Americans, a British woman and a German woman who had been running an eye clinic in the country died of gunshot wounds. Sabjullah Mujaheed, a Taliban spokesman, said later that they had been killed because they were missionaries and spies for the United States.

2011

Nigeria: On 26 August 2011, the United Nations Headquarters in Abuja, Nigeria was attacked by a suicide car bomber, killing at least 18 people, injuring dozens, and causing massive devastation to the building itself. Boko Haram claimed responsibility.
Syria: On 7 September 2011 attack on the ambulance by unknown assailants injured three rescuers and the wounded patient it was transporting in Homs, later on (14 September 2011) one of the rescuers (Hakam Drak Sibai) died due to his wounds.
Somalia: On 23 December 2011, 2 United Nations aid workers and a 3rd colleague were shot to death in Mataban Town in the Hiban Province in central Somalia. The United Nations' workers, who worked specifically for the World Food Program, had been monitoring the distribution of food and camps for internally displaced peoples.  United Nations operations in Mataban were temporarily suspended, pending an investigation.
 Mogadishu, Somalia - December 29, 2011 - A doctor and a logistician working for MSF are shot to death in their compound .
 Dadaab, Kenya: Two Spanish women who worked for Médecins sans Frontières were kidnapped by gunmen and released in July 2013.

2013

 Aleppo, Syria: A worker for Support to Life, Kayla Mueller, was kidnapped by ISIS and killed in 2015.

2014
Afghanistan: Two Finnish aid workers with the International Assistance Mission, a Christian medical charity, were shot and killed in Herat by two men on motorbikes. The women were in a taxi when shot.
Syria: British aid worker David Cawthorne Haines was kidnapped in early 2013 in northeastern Syria, near the Atmeh refugee camp near the Turkish border and the Syrian province of Idlib. He was seized along with an Italian aid worker and two Syrians who have since been freed. Haines was apparently executed by a member of the Islamic State of Iraq and the Levant called Mohammed Emwazi, in September 2014.
 Ukraine: An ICRC worker was killed by a shell in Donetsk.

2015
Afghanistan: Kunduz hospital airstrike by the United States military killed 42 Médecins Sans Frontières staff and patients, 30 October.

2016
 Syria: Around twenty civilians and one SARC staff member were killed, as they were unloading trucks carrying vital humanitarian aid. Much of the aid was destroyed. The attack deprives thousands of civilians of much-needed food and medical assistance.
 Nigeria: A humanitarian convoy was attacked in Borno State and a UNICEF worker was injured.
 Afghanistan: Five Emiratis carrying out humanitarian work were killed in a terrorist bomb attack in Afghanistan. Mohammed Ali Zainal Al Bastaki, Abdullah Mohammed Essa Obaid Al Kaabi, Ahmed Rashid Salim Ali Al Mazroui, Ahmed Abdul Rahman Ahmad Al Tunaiji, and Abdul Hamid Sultan Abdullah Ibrahim Al Hammadi had been on a mission to carry out humanitarian, educational and development projects in the Republic of Afghanistan.

2017 

 Nigeria: 6 aid workers were killed, 8 seriously wounded, and numerous civilians were killed following a government airstrike on a refugee camp in Rann, Borno state on January 17, 2017. 
 Somalia: 6 aid workers were killed and 13 seriously wounded by the vehicle-borne IED in Mogadishu on October 14, 2017.

2019
 Kabul, Afghanistan: United Nations Development Programme aids were attacked and one, Anil Raj, was killed.
 An independent humanitarian research organization, Humanitarian Outcomes, conducted a survey revealing that in 2019, a record number of 277 major attacks took place against aid workers. Besides, 483 aid workers were killed, kidnapped or wounded in that year, which was the highest number since 1997.

2020 

 Kabul, Afghanistan: An attack by gunmen on the maternity ward of Dasht-e-Barchi hospital, run by MSF, resulted in the death of at least 24 people – including mothers, young children, and an MSF midwife.
 Niger: An attack resulted in the death of eight people, of which seven were staff working for the French NGO ACTED, and one their guide.
 Yemen: In an attack on Aden airport, at least three ICRC staff were killed and three more injured.
 Nigeria: Five aid workers of ACF abducted and later executed in Borno state, by Jihadists.

2021 

 Ethiopia: Three MSF staff were killed in the Tigray region.

See also
 International Day of United Nations Peacekeepers
 Monument to Canadian Aid Workers
 World Humanitarian Day

References

External links
 IRC Suspends Activity in Afghanistan after the Murder of Four Employees Central Asia Health Review. Aug. 14, 2008
 UNHCR Report on Atambua killings
 Extract from Human Rights Watch report Refugees, Asylum Seekers, and Internally Displaced Persons
 Paying the Ultimate Price: Analysis of the deaths of humanitarian aid workers  (1997–2001)
 Security Advice for Aid Workers (Aid Workers Network)
 ECHO Generic Security Guide for Humanitarian Organisations
 ICRC – Neutral and independent humanitarian action – Consolidated report of the Commissions
 Centre for Humanitarian Dialogue and Small Arms Survey
 Protect Interpreters from Threats, Kidnapping, Injury, Death and Imprisonment
 Christine Witcutt Memorial Fund
 RedR UK – an international NGO that provides recruitment, training and support services for humanitarian professionals across the world
Centre for Safety and Development
 HPG -Providing aid in insecure environments: trends in policy and operations
 HPG In the Line of Fire
 HPG No Relief
 ALNAP The State of the Humanitarian System

Law of war
Humanitarian aid

humanitarian